Melisande may refer to:

 Mélisande (électrotrad), Canadian folk music group
 Melisande (Stokes), an 1890s painting by Marianne Stokes
 Melisande Shahrizai, the primary villain of Jacqueline Carey's Kushiel's Legacy series
 "Melisande," short story by E. Nesbit
Melisande! What Are Dreams?, a 2012 novel by Hillel Halkin

See also 
 Pelléas and Mélisande (disambiguation)
 Melisende (disambiguation)
 Millicent (disambiguation)
 Melisandre, a character in George R. R. Martin's A Song of Ice and Fire and its adaptation Game of Thrones